Ferguson Lake is a lake in geographic Hess Township, Sudbury District in Northeastern Ontario, Canada. It is in the Great Lakes Basin and is the source of Carhess Creek.

There are no inflows. The primary outflow, at the south and leading south to Green Lake, is Carhess Creek, which flows via the Onaping River, the Vermilion River and the Spanish River to Lake Huron.

References

Other map sources:

See also
List of lakes of Ontario

Lakes of Sudbury District